GHH may refer to:

 Garhi Harsaru Junction railway station, in Haryana, India
 Ghale language
 Glasgow Homeopathic Hospital, in Scotland
 Greenwood–Hercowitz–Huffman preferences
 Gutehoffnungshütte, a German manufacturing company